Bjarne Henriksen (born 18 January 1959) is a Danish film and television actor.

Biography
Henriksen was born in Såderup, Funen in 1959. He has appeared in theatre productions at the Jomfru Ane Teatret, Aalborg and at the Svalegangen theater, Aarhus, and has played supporting roles in numerous Danish films from the late 1990s through to the present, including De største helte, Festen, Kinamand, and Af banen.
He has appeared in two films by Jonas Elmer: Let's Get Lost and Monas verden.

More recently, he has been known for playing the lead role of Theis Birk Larsen, father of the murdered Nanna Birk Larsen in season one of the DR television drama series The Killing, first broadcast in 2007.

In 2011, Henriksen, along with Sofie Gråbøl, Søren Malling, Ann Eleonora Jørgensen, and Lars Mikkelsen were nominated in the Crime Thriller Awards for their work in The Killing.

In 2015, Henriksen played the role of the Danish ferry captain Søren Carlsen in the Icelandic crime drama series Trapped''.

Selected filmography

Film

Television

References

External links
 
 Bjarne Henriksen in Den Danske Filmdatabase
 Bjarne Henriksen at Panorama Agency

Danish male film actors
Danish male stage actors
Danish male television actors
People from Nyborg Municipality
Living people
1959 births
20th-century Danish male actors
21st-century Danish male actors